Big Bad World is a British television sitcom which first aired on Comedy Central in 2013. Created by Joe Tucker and Lloyd Woolf, it stars Blake Harrison as Ben, a directionless, young graduate who returns to his home town of Great Yarmouth after leaving university.

Cast 
Blake Harrison as Ben Turnbull
Rebecca Humphries as Beth
David Fynn as Oakley
Seann Walsh as Eggman
James Fleet as Neil Turnbull
Caroline Quentin as Jan Turnbull
Scarlett Alice Johnson as Lucy Deacon
Alex Lanipekun as Steve
Julia Deakin as Shirley
Jay Brown as Dean

Episodes

Reception
The show received a generally positive critical reaction with some mixed reviews. The Guardian praised the series as "a surprisingly engaging original series from Comedy Central UK" and "a funny take on the challenges of adulthood". The Metro said of episode 1, "So far, so promising. Harrison is adept at the whole man-child thing and he's surrounded by a convincing bunch of slacker, lives-going-nowhere mates, for whom a trip to Chelmsford is the height of excitement” and later praised the show as "a clever and funny insight into graduate life".

Criticising the show as being "marred by some unnecessarily post-Partridge moments", the Radio Times nevertheless said, "Big Bad World sparks into life when it stops trying too hard and forges its own path. Ben and Beth are easy to warm to, while Scarlett Johnson expertly cuts a diabolically fluffy figure as femme fatale Lucy." DIY magazine praised the opening episode's "innate watchability", commenting that "Making us care for characters is no mean feat and creators Joe Tucker and Lloyd Woolf seem to have a plan to make us fall for Ben and his merry band of men and women. A few more episodes in to allow for everyone to settle in and it’s fair to say that the future is promising for Big Bad World."

References

External links 
 

2013 British television series debuts
2013 British television series endings
2010s British sitcoms
Comedy Central (British TV channel) original programming
English-language television shows
Great Yarmouth
Television series about families
Television series by All3Media
Television shows set in Norfolk